Azmat Rana, 
(3 November 1951 – 30 May 2015) was a Pakistani cricketer who played in one Test match and two One Day Internationals in 1980.

References

1951 births
2015 deaths
Azmat Rana
Azmat Rana
Azmat Rana
Pakistani cricketers
Bahawalpur cricketers
Pakistan International Airlines A cricketers
Pakistan International Airlines cricketers
Punjab A cricketers
Rawalpindi cricketers
Muslim Commercial Bank cricketers
Cricketers from Lahore
Punjabi people